Litchfield is a village in the Basingstoke and Deane district of Hampshire, England. It is closely bypassed by the A34 trunk road between Newbury and Whitchurch, which follows the course of the former Didcot, Newbury and Southampton Railway. Litchfield railway station, which closed in 1960, was on this line. The station is a private house, not owned by C.A.H Wills who owns Litchfield farms estate and lives in the village. The station was sold by Hampshire County Council in 1978 and has been restored. The approach road is now a private drive to the property. In 1976 the Litchfield - Whitchurch bypass was opened and made use of the DN&SR trackbed south of Litchfield towards Whitchurch for a distance of one mile.

Governance
The village is part of the civil parish of Litchfield and Woodcott and is part of the Burghclere, Highclere and St. Mary Bourne ward of Basingstoke and Deane borough council. The borough council is a Non-metropolitan district of Hampshire County Council.

Church of St James the Less 
The church of St James the Less is a Grade II* listed building.

References

External links

Villages in Hampshire